The 1953–54 English National League season was the 13th and final season of the English National League, the top level ice hockey league in England. Five teams participated in the league, and the Nottingham Panthers won the championship.

The league merged with the Scottish National League to form the British National League for the 1954-55 season.

Regular season

External links
 Nottingham Panthers history site

Eng
Engl
Engl
English National League seasons
1953–54 in British ice hockey